Kaplanovo is a small settlement west of Velike Lašče in central Slovenia. The entire Municipality of Velike Lašče is part of the traditional region of Lower Carniola. It is included in the Central Slovenia Statistical Region.

References

External links

Kaplanovo on Geopedia

Populated places in the Municipality of Velike Lašče